Jack Baldwin  (born May 31, 1948 in Marietta, Georgia) is a race car driver. Jack Baldwin is a legend in road racing, with wins in every series that he has competed in, as well as victories at every major race track in the United States during his successful career that has spanned four decades. Jack has won 5 professional Championships and over 30 major pro races that include one Daytona 24 Hour win and two 12 hours of Sebring wins. Jack was invited twice to compete in the prestigious International Race of Champions (IROC) and has driven all types of race cars over the decades. 2013 was his 25th running of the Rolex 24 Hours at Daytona. Baldwin currently drives a Porsche Cayman S for GTSport Racing in the Pirelli World Challenge and is the most successful Porsche Cayman S driver in the world with seven wins, over a dozen pole positions and twenty-plus podium finishes.

IROC Involvement
Jack Baldwin has been invited to the International Race of Champions twice, in 1993 and 1994. During this time his best finish was two second-place finishes in a photo finish beating Dale Earnhardt at the Talladega Superspeedway and Darlington Speedway finishing between Mark Martin and Dale Earnhardt.

NASCAR 
Baldwin made his NASCAR debut in 1994 at a Busch Series race at Atlanta Motor Speedway. Driving the #95 Royal Oak Charcoal Chevrolet for Buz McCall's American Equipment Racing, Baldwin qualified 26th and finished 23rd. He ran his next race two weeks later at Darlington Raceway, finishing 24th. In 1998, he returned to the Busch Series to run the Lysol 200 in the #59 Kingsford Chevy for ST Motorsports, and finished 20th. He ran the Lysol 200 the next year for Jimmy Spencer in the #12 Zippo car, and finished 4th.

SCCA Trans-Am
Baldwin began his Trans-Am driving career in 1990 and achieved the Rookie of The Year Award. In 1992 Baldwin was the Champion of Trans Am Series, being the first driver of the modern era to complete every lap of every race of that season, which earned him the Chevy Proud Motorsports Achievement Award for outstanding performance. He drove the Mattel Hot Wheels #25 and #1 Chevy Camaro for American Equipment Racing.

IMSA
Baldwin won the 1984 24 Hour Race at Daytona driving a Mazda in the GTU Class. He won the 12 Hours of Sebring in 1984 and 1997.
Baldwin also won the 1984 and 1985 Camel GTU Championships driving the Malibu Grand Prix Mazda RX 7.  Following his back-to-back Champion season he went on to drive the Pearless Levi Garrett GTO Division Camaro

Grand-Am
Baldwin drove the number 74 Riley and Scott MkIII B and C for Robinson Racing from 1999-2004. Winning at Mid-Ohio and Phoenix. He has driven in 25 straight Rolex 24 Hour at Daytona races, including one victory.

Pirelli World Challenge
Baldwin is the most successful Porsche Cayman S driver in the world. He currently drives the #73 GTSport Racing Porsche Cayman S in the Pirelli World Challenge Series. His current accolades in the series include:

2012 Winner Long Beach Grand Prix
2012 Second Place Laguna Seca
2012 Second Place Detroit Grand Prix
2012 Second Place Mosport
2012 Third Place Overall Drivers Championship (inaugural season with PWCC)

2013 Winner St. Pete Grand Prix (Rounds 1&2)
2013 Third Place Long Beach Grand Prix (Round 3)
2013 Third Place COTA (Rounds 4&5)
2013 Third Place Detroit Grand Prix (Round 6)
2013 Third Place Lime Rock Grand Prix (Round 8)
2013 Winner Lime Rock Grand prix (Round 9)
2013 Third Place Streets of Toronto (Round 10) 
2013 Second Place Overall Drivers Championship

2014 Third Place Streets of St. Petersburg (Round 1)
2014 Third Place Barber Motorsports Park (Round 3)
2014 First Place Barber Motorsports Park (Round 4)
2014 Second Place Detroit Grand Prix (Round 5)
2014 Winner Sonoma Grand Prix 
2014 Second Place Sonoma Grand Prix 
2014 Second Place Miller Motorsports Park 
2014 Winner Miller Motorsports Park 
2014 Second Place Overall Drivers Championship

2015 Third Place Canadian Tire Motorsport Park (Round 7) 
2015 Winner Canadian Tire Motorsport Park (Round 8)

www.gtsportracing.com

Motorsports career results

SCCA National Championship Runoffs

NASCAR
(key) (Bold – Pole position awarded by qualifying time. Italics – Pole position earned by points standings or practice time. * – Most laps led.)

Winston Cup Series

Busch Series

International Race of Champions
(key) (Bold – Pole position. * – Most laps led.)

References

External links

American racing drivers
International Race of Champions drivers
Living people
NASCAR drivers
24 Hours of Daytona drivers
Sportspeople from Marietta, Georgia
Racing drivers from Atlanta
Racing drivers from Georgia (U.S. state)
Rolex Sports Car Series drivers
1948 births
Trans-Am Series drivers
SCCA National Championship Runoffs participants
Rocketsports Racing drivers